WKYW (1490 AM) is a radio station broadcasting a hot adult contemporary format. Licensed to Frankfort, Kentucky, the station serves the capital city of Kentucky and parts of the nearby Lexington metropolitan area. The station is owned by CapCity Communications. Its programming is simulcast on translator station W228CL (93.5 FM).

History
Prior to February 2011, the format was news/talk.

On March 18, 2013, WKYW changed their format to classic hits, branded as "Passport Radio 1490".

In 2015, FM translator W228CL began broadcasting on FM frequency 93.5 MHz as a simulcast of WKYW.

On April 1, 2021, WKYW and W228CL split from its simulcast with WFRT and WKYL and launched a hot adult contemporary format, branded as "Pop Radio 93.5".

Translator

Previous logo

References

External links

KYW
Hot adult contemporary radio stations in the United States
Radio stations established in 1946
1946 establishments in Kentucky